Blitzers (stylized as BLITZERS) is a South Korean boy band formed by Wuzo Entertainment in 2021. The group consists of seven members: Jinhwa, Go_U, Juhan, Sya, Chris, Lutan and Wooju. The group debuted on May 12, 2021, with the EP, Check-In.

Members 
Adapted from their Melon Profile.

 Jinhwa (진화)
 Go_U (고유)
 Juhan (주한)
 Sya (샤)
 Chris (크리스)
 Lutan (루탄)
 Wooju (우주)

Discography

Extended plays

Single albums

Singles

Soundtrack appearances

Awards and nominations

References

2021 establishments in South Korea
Musical groups from Seoul
K-pop music groups
Musical groups established in 2021
South Korean dance music groups
South Korean boy bands
Peak Time contestants